Johannes (Juho) Lepistö (25 January 1861, Hartola - 25 February 1941) was a Finnish farmer and politician. He was a member of the Parliament of Finland from 1907 to 1908, representing the Finnish Party

References

1861 births
1941 deaths
People from Hartola, Finland
People from Mikkeli Province (Grand Duchy of Finland)
Finnish Party politicians
Members of the Parliament of Finland (1907–08)
Finnish farmers